The Island is a 1979 Argentine drama film written and directed by Alejandro Doria. It was the first Argentine film to be a box office success during the military dictatorship. The film was also selected as the Argentine entry for the Best Foreign Language Film at the 52nd Academy Awards, but was not accepted as a nominee.

Cast
 Selva Alemán
 Hugo Arana
 Aldo Barbero
 Héctor Bidonde
 Luisina Brando
 Alicia Bruzzo
 Franklin Caicedo
 Lito Cruz
 Graciela Dufau
 Juan Carlos Gianuzzi
 Lisardo Laphitz
 Sandra Mihanovich
 Aníbal Morixe
 Marzenka Novak

See also
 List of submissions to the 52nd Academy Awards for Best Foreign Language Film
 List of Argentine submissions for the Academy Award for Best Foreign Language Film

References

External links
 

1979 films
1979 drama films
Argentine drama films
1970s Spanish-language films
Films set on islands
Films directed by Alejandro Doria
1970s Argentine films